Reid William Barton (born May 6, 1983) is a mathematician and also one of the most successful performers in the International Science Olympiads.

Biography

Barton is the son of two environmental engineers.  Officially homeschooled since third grade, Barton took part-time classes at Tufts University in chemistry (5th grade), physics (6th grade), and subsequently Swedish, Finnish, French, and Chinese. Since eighth grade he worked part-time with MIT computer scientist Charles E. Leiserson on CilkChess, a computer chess program. Subsequently, he worked at Akamai Technologies with computer scientist Ramesh Sitaraman to build one of the earliest video performance measurement systems that have since become a standard in industry. After Akamai, Barton went to grad school at Harvard to pursue a Ph.D. in mathematics, which he completed in 2019. Afterwards, he did research as a post-doctoral fellow at Pittsburgh.   As of November 2021 he sits on the committee for the

Mathematical and programming competitions 
Barton was the first student to win four gold medals at the International Mathematical Olympiad, culminating in full marks at the 2001 Olympiad held in Washington, D.C., shared with Gabriel Carroll, Xiao Liang and Zhang Zhiqiang.

Barton is one of seven people to have placed among the five top ranked competitors (who are themselves not ranked against each other) in the William Lowell Putnam Competition four times (2001–2004). Barton was a member of the MIT team which finished second in 2001 and first in 2003 and 2004.

Barton has won two gold medals at the International Olympiad in Informatics. In 2001 he finished first with 580 points out of 600, 55 ahead of his nearest competitor, the largest margin in IOI history at the time. Barton was a member of the 2nd and 5th place MIT team at the ACM International Collegiate Programming Contest, and reached the finals in the Topcoder Open (2004), semi-finals (2003, 2006), the TopCoder Collegiate Challenge (2004), semi-finals (2006), TCCC Regional finals (2002), and TopCoder Invitational semi-finalist (2002).

Other accomplishments
Barton has won the Morgan Prize awarded jointly by the American Mathematical Society and the Mathematical Association of America for his work on packing densities.

Barton has taught at various academic Olympiad training programs for high school students, such as the Mathematical Olympiad Summer Program.

Selected publications 
.
.

References

External links 
 Reid Barton's Harvard Math page
 Citation by the American Mathematical Society for Frank and Brennie Morgan Prize for Outstanding Research in Mathematics by an Undergraduate
 

1983 births
Living people
Putnam Fellows
Harvard Graduate School of Arts and Sciences alumni
21st-century American mathematicians
People from Arlington, Massachusetts
International Mathematical Olympiad participants
Competitive programmers